Francisco Alves is a municipality in the state of Paraná in the Southern Region of Brazil. It lies along the roads BR-272 and PR-182.

See also
List of municipalities in Paraná

References

Municipalities in Paraná